Mitrella annobonensis is a species of sea snail in the family Columbellidae, the dove snails.

Distribution
The species occurs off the island of Annobón, Equatorial Guinea.

References

annobonensis
Fauna of Annobón
Endemic fauna of Equatorial Guinea
Gastropods described in 2005